Roland Varno (March 15, 1908 – May 24, 1996) was an American character actor from Utrecht, Netherlands. 

Varno's father was a tea planter, Martin Fredrick Vuerhard, and his mother was a concert pianist. Although they hoped for him to have a military career, he began acting when he was 16 years old, the youngest member of the royal Dutch theater at that time. After he graduated from college in Leyden, he traveled and continued to study dramatics. He went to Hollywood after a talent scout for MGM saw him in a German film in 1931.

Varno worked in vaudeville, performing and designing scenery.

He appeared in dozens of films in the 1930s and 1940s. During World War II, Varno served in the Office of Strategic Services, the predecessor to the Central Intelligence Agency.

Varno also appeared on TV series including Space Patrol, the Adventures of Wild Bill Hickok and 77 Sunset Strip.

Born Jacob Frederik Vuerhard, he was the father of Martin Varno, author of the 1958 science fiction film Night of the Blood Beast. He was married to Elizabeth Alderson. They also had a daughter, Jillian Mariana.

Varno died on May 24, 1996 in Lancaster, California.

Partial filmography

 The First Kiss (1928) - Swimmer (film debut, uncredited)
 Ein kleiner Vorschuß auf die Seligkeit (1929) - Eton boy
 Zwischen vierzehn und siebzehn - Sexualnot der Jugend (1929) - Child
 Tragedy of Youth (1929) - Peter
 The Blue Angel (1930) - Gymnasiast Lohmann / Pupil
 The Man in Search of His Murderer (1931)
 Arsène Lupin (1932) - Jean Moucante (uncredited)
 As You Desire Me (1932) - Albert
 Private Jones (1933) - Lt. Brinkerhoff (uncredited)
 Malle Gevallen (1934) - Student Boy
 Het meisje met den blauwen hoed (1934) - Daantje
 Three Live Ghosts (1936) - German Corporal (uncredited)
 Sins of Man (1936) - Consul Clerk (uncredited)
 Quality Street (1937) - Ens. Blades (uncredited)
 The Woman I Love (1937) (uncredited)
 The Emperor's Candlesticks (1937) - Czar's Officer (uncredited)
 Conquest (1937) - Staos (uncredited)
 The Great Waltz (1938) - Orderly (uncredited)
 Gunga Din (1939) - Lt. Markham (uncredited)
 Balalaika (1939) - Lt. Nikitin 
 The Fighting 69th (1940) - German Officer (uncredited)
 Zanzibar (1940) - Reporter (uncredited)
 Three Faces West (1940) - Dr. Eric Von Scherer
 Mystery Sea Raider (1940) - Lt. Schmidt
 Underground (1941) - Ernst Demmler
 Our Wife (1941) - Steward (uncredited)
 The Devil Pays Off (1941) - Ship's Doctor
 The Corsican Brothers (1941) - De Revenau's Friend at Opera (uncredited)
 Paris Calling (1941) - German Pilot (uncredited)
 Nazi Agent (1942) - Bauer (uncredited)
 To Be or Not to Be (1942) - Pilot (uncredited)
 Eagle Squadron (1942) - Aide-de-camp (uncredited)
 I Married an Angel (1942) - Man (uncredited)
 Desperate Journey (1942) - Unteroffizier (uncredited)
 Valley of Hunted Men (1942) - Carl Baum
 Hitler's Children (1943) - Lieutenant S.A. (uncredited)
 Edge of Darkness (1943) - German Lieutenant (uncredited)
 Action in the North Atlantic (1943) - Gunnery Captain (uncredited)
 Hostages (1943) - Jan Pavel
 The Return of the Vampire (1943) - John Ainsley
 Women in Bondage (1943) - Ernest Bracken
 Our Hearts Were Young and Gay (1944) - Pierre Cambouille (uncredited)
 The Unwritten Code (1944) - Cpl. Karl Richter
 Betrayal from the East (1945) - Kurt Guenther
 The Master Key (1945, Serial) - Arnold Hoffman - aka Hoff, M-3
 Three's a Crowd (1945) - Ronald Drew
 Paris Underground (1945) - Lieutenant Commander Stowe (uncredited)
 My Name Is Julia Ross (1945) - Dennis Bruce
 Follow That Woman (1945) - Minor Role
 Flight to Nowhere (1946) - James Van Bush
 Scared to Death (1947) - Ward Van Ee
 Letter from an Unknown Woman (1948) - Stefan's Second (uncredited)
 Act of Violence (1949) - German (voice, uncredited)
 Battleground (1949) - German Lieutenant (uncredited)
 Mask of the Avenger (1951) - Lieutenant (uncredited)
 Adventures of Wild Bill Hickok (1951-1952, TV Series) - Cleary / Clem (uncredited)
 Back at the Front (1952) - Smuggler Vishmirov (uncredited)
 Dangerous Assignment (1952) - Manter/Bela (uncredited)
 Space Patrol (1952-1953, TV Series) - Doc / Dr. S. Buehl (uncredited)
 The Mad Magician (1954) - Master of Ceremonies (uncredited)
 Topper (1954, TV Series) - Matre'd (uncredited)
 Public Defender (1954, TV Series) - George Morgan 
 Cavalcade of America (1954) - Captain Von Holst 
 Jump Into Hell (1955) - Col. Lonjunier (uncredited)
 Crusader (1955, TV Series) - MVD Man 
 You Are There (1956, TV Series) - Lt. Gerhardt 
 Science Fiction Theatre (1956, TV Series) - Scientist 
 Istanbul (1957) - Mr. Florian (final film)
 77 Sunset Strip (1959, TV Series) - Rolfe Berne (final appearance)

References

External links

1908 births
1996 deaths
20th-century American male actors
Actors from Utrecht (city)
American military personnel of World War II
American male film actors
Dutch emigrants to the United States
Dutch male film actors
People of the Office of Strategic Services